Józef Panuś is a Polish former professional football player, former football manager, and current reality television personality, musician, entrepreneur in wood carpentry and sculpture and conservator.

After having played for local clubs, most notably for the then third division Dalin Myślenice, he was sold to Silesian mining club GKS Tychy for a transfer fee of 2 tonnes of coal.

He played 17 games in the Ekstraklasa for Zagłębie Sosnowiec before a career-threatening injury caused him to take a break and returning to play much later at the third tier again.

He re-gained fame in 2021 by appearing in the television reality show Ninja Warrior Poland, where he played his accordion, having played it from a young age and even taking it to his away matches during his playing career.

References

Living people
1963 births
Polish footballers
Association football midfielders
GKS Tychy players
Polish football managers
Zagłębie Sosnowiec players